Aëtius of Antioch, surnamed "the Atheist" by his trinitarian enemies, founder of Anomoeanism, was a native of Coele-Syria.

Life and writings
Aëtius grew up in poverty or slavery. He later worked as a goldsmith in Antioch to support his widowed mother and studied philosophy. After his mother died, Aëtius continued his trade and extended his studies into the Christian scriptures, Christian theology, and medicine.

After working as a vine-dresser and then as a goldsmith, he became a traveling doctor, and displayed great skill in disputations on medical subjects; but his controversial power soon found a wider field for its exercise in the great theological question of the time. He studied successively under the Arians, Athanasius, bishop of Anazarbus, and the presbyter Antonius of Tarsus. In 350 he was ordained a deacon by Leontius of Antioch, but was shortly afterwards forced by the trinitarian party to leave that town. At the first synod of Sirmium he won a dialectic victory over the homoiousian bishops, Basilius and Eustathius, who sought in consequence vainly to stir up against him the enmity of Constantius Gallus. In 356 he went to Alexandria with Eunomius in order to advocate Arianism. Here he is said to have debated Manichean Aphthonius of Alexandria so vigorously that the latter died after the encounter. Aëtius was afterwards banished from Alexandria by Constantius II. Julian recalled him from exile, bestowed upon him an estate in Lesbos, and retained him for a time at his court in Constantinople. Being consecrated a bishop, he used his office in the interests of Arianism by creating other bishops of that party. At the accession of Valens (364), he retired to his estate at Lesbos, but soon returned to Constantinople, where he died in 367.

Anomoean sect
The Anomoean sect of the Arians, of whom he was the leader, are sometimes called after him Aetians. His work De Fide has been preserved in connection with a refutation written by Epiphanius (Haer. lxxvi. 10). Its main thought is that the homoousia, i.e. the doctrine that the Son (therefore the Begotten) is essentially God, is self-contradictory, since the idea of unbegottenness is just that which constitutes the nature of God.

In one of his treatises, Saint Basil the Great writes against the Anomoeans led by Aëtius, whom he describes an instrument in the hands of "the enemy of truth". Aëtius is said to have been the first to articulate the doctrine that the Father and the Only Begotten Son do not share the same divine substance.

Notes

References
Harnack, A. History of Dogma, vol iv, passim (reference in EB11)
Encyclopædia Britannica Eleventh Edition, s.v. Aetius.
La Grande Encyclopédie, s.v. Aétius d'Antioche.

4th-century Christian theologians
Arian Christians
4th-century Romans
4th-century Arian Christians
4th-century writers
Nature of Jesus Christ